Otter Tail Lake is a  lake in the west-central part of the U.S. state of Minnesota and is the largest lake in Otter Tail County.

Geography 

Adjoining the city of Ottertail, it is a part of the Otter Tail River chain of lakes. Upstream from the lake are Big Pine, Little Pine and Rush lakes, while downstream are East Lost, West Lost and Deer lakes. Lake Blanche (Minnesota) also flows into Otter Tail Lake. The shore of the lake and at least the shallower areas are composed of sand and gravel. A prominent feature of Otter Tail is the "point" which essentially divides the lake into eastern and western halves.

Otter Tail lake is ringed with a tall, mostly deciduous tree line. In general, the tree line goes back around 300 yards from the shore and acts as a windbreak, keeping the shoreline calm compared to the center of the lake.

The waters of Otter Tail Lake ultimately flow north into Hudson Bay through the Red River of the North.

At 13,725 acres it is the tenth largest lake completely within the borders of Minnesota.

Recreation 

It is a recreational destination, with the majority of its shores surrounded by residential and commercial development. The lake is known for fishing; walleye and Northern pike are most prevalent and the most sought after by anglers. The lake is also a popular destination for boating, power-boats and jet-skis, but also sailing. Because of the lake's large size, winds can pick up enough in the center of the lake for fairly challenging sailing. The heyday of sailing on the lake was the late 1960s through the mid-1980s, when the lake held annual sailing races. Especially popular at this time was the hobie cat.

Ottertail Lake is also the home of the Reel Country Classic, a two-day fishing tournament that has taken place every May since 2005.

References

Lakes of Otter Tail County, Minnesota
Lakes of Minnesota